Ali Mitayev (1881 – 1925) was a Chechen sheikh and leader of anti-Soviet movement in the 1920s.

Born in the Chechen aul Avtury, Mitayev was educated at a madrasah in Grozny and, in 1912, founded a similar school in his native village. During the Russian Revolution of 1917 and the ensuing Russian Civil War, Mitayev was one of the most influential Sufi sheikhs in Chechnya and Ingushetia. In 1919 he forged an alliance with the Bolsheviks against Denikin’s White forces provided the Bolsheviks would guarantee Chechen autonomy and Muslim religious practices within a Soviet system. Mitayev himself joined the Communist party and became a member of the Chechen revkom. Mitayev’s cooperation with the Soviets ended in 1923, when he declared a jihad to the Bolsheviks and attempted a coup. In April 1924 he was arrested as a "counter-revolutionary", "saboteur", and "clerical bourgeois nationalist" and was accused of preparing a joint Georgian-Chechen rebellion against the Soviet rule. He was tried in Rostov-on-Don and shot in 1925.

References 

1881 births
1925 deaths
People from Shalinsky District, Chechen Republic
People from Terek Oblast
Chechen politicians
Chechen people executed by the Soviet Union
Executed people from Chechnya
Muslims from the Russian Empire